This is a list of NAIA (National Association of Intercollegiate Athletics) Division II football seasons from when the NAIA split its football championship into two divisions in 1970 until it consolidated back into a single championship in 1996.

Multiple Divisions (1970–1996)

See also
List of NCAA Division I-A/FBS football seasons
List of NCAA Division I-AA/FCS football seasons
List of NCAA Division II football seasons
List of NCAA Division III football seasons

References

NAIA Football National Championship